Zabelia is a genus of flowering plant in the family Caprifoliaceae.

Species
Zabelia angustifolia (Bureau & Franch.) Makino
Zabelia biflora (Turcz.) Makino
Zabelia brachystemon (Diels) Golubk.
Zabelia buddleioides (W.W.Sm.) Hisauti & H.Hara
Zabelia corymbosa (Regel & Schmalh.) Makino
Zabelia densipila M.P.Hong, Y.C.Kim & B.Y.Lee
Zabelia dielsii (Graebn.) Makino
Zabelia integrifolia (Koidz.) Makino ex Ikuse & S.Kuros.
Zabelia onkocarpa (Graebn.) Makino
Zabelia parvifolia (C.B.Clarke) Golubk.
Zabelia triflora (R.Br. ex Wall.) Makino
Zabelia tyaihyonii (Nakai) Hisauti & H.Hara
Zabelia umbellata (Graebn. & Buchw.) Makino

References

Caprifoliaceae